The 2015 Southland Conference women's soccer tournament was the postseason women's soccer tournament for the Southland Conference held from November 5 to 8, 2015. The five match tournament was at Bill Stephens Track/Soccer Stadium in Conway, Arkansas. The six team single-elimination tournament consisted of three rounds based on seeding from regular season conference play. The Houston Baptist Huskies were the defending tournament champions after defeating the Stephen F. Austin Ladyjacks 2-0 in the championship match.

Bracket

Notes

All-Tournament team

Source:

MVP in bold

References

External links 
2015 Southland Conference Women's Soccer Championship

 
Southland Conference Women's Soccer Tournament